The Thagone mine is a large potash mine in northern Laos in Vientiane Province. Thagone is one of the largest potash reserves in Laos having estimated reserves of 50.3 billion tonnes of ore grading 15% potassium chloride.

References 

Potash mines in Laos